Clan Hunter is a Scottish clan.

History

Origins of the clan
It is likely that the Hunters went to Scotland with David I of Scotland upon his invitation and were given lands named Hunter's Toune.

In 1296 Aylmer le Hunter of the county of Ayr appears on the Ragman Rolls submitting to Edward I of England.

A charter signed by Robert II of Scotland on 2 May 1374 has survived that confirmed a grant of land to William Hunter for his faithful service rendered and to be rendered to us in return for a silver penny payable to the Sovereign at Hunterston on the Feast of Pentecost. To this day the Laird of Hunterston, chief of Clan Hunter keeps silver pennies, minted in the reigns of Robert II and George V in case of a royal visit on the day appointed for payment of her rent. The William Hunter who received this charter is reckoned to have been the tenth Hunter of Hunterston. In earlier records both William Hunter and Norman Hunter appear using the Latin form of the name, Venator.

15th and 16th centuries

The Hunters were hereditary keepers of the royal forests of Arran and Little Cumbrae by the fifteenth century. The family appear to have held this office from an early date and also claim a long descent from people who held similar offices in England and Normandy before they came to Scotland.

During the sixteenth century the Hunters rendered chiefly military service. John Hunter, the fourteenth Laird was killed with his king at the Battle of Flodden in 1513. His son was Robert who was  trouble with sickness and infirmity and was excused from military service in 1542 by James V of Scotland, providing that he sent his eldest son in his place. His son was Mungo who was killed at the Battle of Pinkie Cleugh in 1547.

17th century

Successive generations of Hunters were more peaceful Lairds and tended to their estates and looked after their tenants. Robert Hunter who was a son of the twentieth Laird graduated at the University of Glasgow in 1643 and was minister of West Kilbride. He bought lands and founded the Hunters of Kirkland branch of the clan.

A grandson of the twentieth Laird was another Robert Hunter who served under Marlborough and was Governor of Virginia and later Governor of New York.

18th and 19th centuries

The family suffered from financial problems in the early eighteenth century. These problems were resolved by yet another Robert Hunter, a younger son of the twenty second Laird who succeeded to the estate and managed it well. He was succeeded by his daughter, Eleanora, who married her cousin, Robert Caldwell. He assumed the name Hunter and together they improved the estate and built the present Hunterston House. Their son had two daughters: Jane Hunter who married Gould Weston and Eleanor who married Robert William Cochran-Patrick.

20th century

Jane Hunter-Weston died in 1911 and was succeeded by her son, Lieutenant General Sir Aylmer Hunter-Weston who served on Kitchener's staff during the Egyptian War of 1896. He also served in the Boer Wars and also as a divisional officer of the British Expeditionary Force in World War I. Also during that war he served during the Gallipoli landings and later commanded the 8th Army on the Western Front.

Post clan activity

As times became more settled the Hunters devoted more time to farming their extensive lands, although they still produced soldiers of distinction over the generations. Gould Hunter-Weston, husband of Jane Hunter-Weston (26th Laird) fought in India at Lucknow in 1857 and their eldest son, Aylmer (27th Laird) was a well-known general in the First World War. He later became Member of Parliament for North Ayrshire. During her tenure as Clan Chief, Eleanora (28th Laird) fought in the courts, but lost, a compulsory purchase order for land at Hunterston to build a nuclear power station.

The last Clan Chief, Neil Hunter of Hunterston and of that Ilk, along with his wife Sonia, Madam Hunter of Hunterston, continued the fight against industrialization. He was well known for his sailing prowess and represented the United Kingdom in two Olympic Games, winning a silver medal at Melbourne in 1956. Like many Hunters before him he was in true tradition an expert in archery.

Chiefs
Lady Pauline Hunter of Hunterston and of that Ilk is the 30th Laird and Chief of Clan Hunter. Her mid-19th century ancestor is reported in May, 1859 as furthering the philanthropic tradition of Clan Hunter; "The Lady of Hunterston tries to elevate and benefit her neighbours in the village of West Kilbride", while her husband, the Laird of Hunterston, "seeks the good of his tenants by provoking emulation amongst them, as regards the quality of their stock".

Clan seat and castle

The seat of the chief of Clan Hunter has been at Hunterston Castle for over 800 years.

Royal Charter

William Huntar of, the 10th laird was granted a Royal Charter by King Robert II of Scotland (1371-1390) signed in Stirling on the 2nd May 1374 for faithful services rendered. This Charter with the Royal Seal is preserved at Hunterston and on display in the castle. It remains the oldest document in the possession of the Hunter Family.

Tartans
The Clan Hunter tartan was designed in 1983 by Capt. T. Stuart Davidson, the founder of the Scottish Tartan Society. The design or Sett as it is known, has been named Hunter of Hunterston to distinguish it from other Hunter tartans such as:

Hunter Russell Mitchell Galbraith sett – A tartan shared between the four families.

Hunters of Bute sett – Hunters who sought allegiance from the Stuarts at one time.

Hunters of Peebleshire sett – An old branch of the Hunter family.

See also
Scottish clan
Barony of Ladyland
Barnweill Church

References

External links
Official website of the Hunter Clan Association in the UK
Official website of the Hunter Clan Association in Canada
Detailed Information on the Hunter Family History
Detailed information about the Hunterston area – home of the Hunter Family and Clan
Unofficial website of Clan Hunter 
Clan Hunter ScotClans

Scottish clans
Scoto-Norman clans